Pushkino is a city and the administrative center of Pushkinsky District in Moscow Oblast, Russia, located at the confluence of the Ucha and Serebryanka Rivers,  northeast of Moscow. Population:    57,000 (1974); 30,000 (1959); 21,000 (1939).

History
According to one of the historic versions, the village of Pushkino was first documented in 1499 when it belonged to Grigory Morkhinin, also known as "Pushka"—a boyar whose male-line descendants include Aleksandr Pushkin. A statue of "Pushka" graces one of the town's main squares. During the following centuries, the neighborhood evolved into a favored summer retreat of Russian nobility. Pushkino was granted town status in August 1925.

Administrative and municipal status
Within the framework of administrative divisions, Pushkino serves as the administrative center of Pushkinsky District. As an administrative division, it is incorporated within Pushkinsky District as the City of Pushkino. As a municipal division, the City of Pushkino is incorporated within Pushkinsky Municipal District as Pushkino Urban Settlement.

Science
The city hosts the Institute of Forest Science, one of the few in Russia.

Architecture and culture
In 1678, a five-domed church of St. Sergius was built at the manor of Komyagino (picture). Another notable estate is Muranovo, where the Russian poets Yevgeny Baratynsky and Fyodor Tyutchev used to spend their summers. A dacha of Vladimir Mayakovsky, who lived in Pushkino during summer seasons of 1920-1928  is also a museum.

Twin towns and sister cities

Pushkino is twinned with:
 Kutná Hora, Czech Republic
 Orivesi, Finland

See also
:Category:People from Pushkino

References

Notes

Sources

Cities and towns in Moscow Oblast
Pushkinsky District, Moscow Oblast